The fourth season of The Great Kiwi Bake Off return to Parihoa Farm in Muriwai, Auckland. This season premiered on Thursday 25 August at 7.30pm on TVNZ 1 and streams on TVNZ+; with Comedian Pax Assadi who joined Hayley Sproull as co-host and chef, restaurateur, writer, and food consultant Peter Gordon, alongside Jordan Rondel, an author and co-founder of international cakery The Caker took over the judging roles.

Brooke Walker, a marketing coordinator from Auckland, won the fourth season of The Great Kiwi Bake Off. Jonathan Willows and Victoria Hume were the other two finalists.

Bakers
Ages, names, and hometowns stated are at time of filming.

Bakers progress

Colour key:

 Baker was the Star Baker.
 Baker was one of the judges' favourite bakers that week but was not the Star Baker.
 Baker got through to the next round.
 Baker was one of the judges' least favourite bakers that week but was not eliminated.
 Baker was eliminated.

Episodes

 Baker eliminated/withdrew
 Star Baker
 Winner

Episode 1: Cake Week (25 August 2022)
Bakers had two hours to bake their signature drizzle cake. Jordan's famous Crème brûlée cake was set as a technical challenge to be completed in two hours. For the showstopper challenge, the bakers had to bake an "Inside out cake" in four hours, a cake representing the bakers' flavours as an adult and a decorated cake symbolising their youth.

Episode 2: Biscuits Week (1 September 2022)
Bakers have 90 minutes to bake their signature 24 identical shortbread biscuits of their choice. Peter set this week’s 90 minutes technical bake with Italian's Pistachio Sbricciolona. Bakers had 4 hours to bake their favourite meal-inspired biscuits for their showstopper.

Episode 3: Retro Classics Week (8 September 2022)
Taking a step back in time, our 8 remaining bakers take on retro classics. Perfecting pastry proves problematic for some, while tiny tarts get golden reviews. Bakers have 4 hours to bake their "decade-inspired" two-tier cake.

Episode 4: Desserts Week (15 September 2022)
Bakers are required to baked or set cheesecakes in 2 hours. A mystery technical bake stuns even the best of bakers. A 5-layered free-standing Truffle Terrine is expected to be completed in 4 and half hours.

Episode 5: Kiwi Bakery Week (22 September 2022)
The kiwi bakery pie gets a gourmet makeover in 4 hours! Then, the bakers battle in the technical challenge to perfect the perfect pastry for Custard Squares in 135 minutes and things get fruity with a tarty showstopper that’s bound to wow the judges

Episode 6: International Week (29 September 2022)
The competition kicks up a notch with international week! A towering technical calls for a guest expert, and the stakes are higher than ever as they put their best choux forward. During the Technical Challenge, Master Chocolatier Thomas Schnetzler provided advice to the bakers.

Episode 7: Chocolate Week (6 October 2022) 
We're chock full of semi-final baking bliss for Chocolate week! The remaining four bakers gnash their teeth over chocolate ganache and tackle a unique Jordan Rondel mystery bake.

Episode 8: Season Final (13 October 2022) 
10 bakers started, now, just three remain, but only one can be crowned winner of The Great Kiwi Bake Off NZ.  With three more challenges to go, who will be named the winner?

References

TVNZ original programming
TVNZ 1 original programming
2022 New Zealand television seasons